This is a list of notable people from or associated with Lucknow, India.

Academics, education and science
 S. P. Chakravarti, father of Electronics and Telecommunications engineering education in India.
 Dalip Kumar Upreti, Indian Lichenologist
 Salman Akhtar, psychoanalyst
 Herbert V. Günther, professor of philosophy
 Mukesh Haikerwal, general practitioner and former federal president of the Australian Medical Association, Companion of the Order of Australia since 2011.
 Asma Hussain, UP's first fashion designer; Head of Asma Hussain Institute of Fashion Technology, Lucknow
 Kailas Nath Kaul, botanist and agricultural scientist
 Gopal Khanna, 5th Director of the Agency for Healthcare Research and Quality, United States Department of Health and Human Services
 Veena Talwar Oldenburg, professor of history
 Anil K. Rajvanshi, rural development expert Padma Shri 2022.
 Kalbe Sadiq, educationist
 Hashima Hasan, she is the James Webb Space Telescope Deputy Program Scientist and the Education and Public Outreach Lead for Astrophysics.

Arts and culture
 Jan Nisar Akhtar, poet and lyricist, father of Javed Akhtar
 Muzaffar Ali, filmmaker
 Naushad Ali, film musician
 Amitabh Bhattacharya, Bollywood singer and lyricist
 Nivedita Bhattacharya, theatre and television actress
 Ranveer Brar, chef, television host
 Pali Chandra, Kathak dancer
 Anup Jalota, Indian classical singer and musician
 Hashim Akhtar Naqvi, Indian calligrapher
 Cliff Richard, British singer and musician, now settled in Portugal and Barbados
 Mohammad Shakeel, contemporary artist
 Kavi Pradeep, Poet and lyricist. Famous for writing patriotic songs

Actors and singers
 Urfi Javed, actress
 Aahana Kumra, actress
 Talat Mahmood, singer
 Sumona Chakravarti, actress
 Tia Bajpai, singer
 Sachet-Parampara,Singer's
 Ali Fazal, actor
Amit Mishra, Singer
 Kanika Kapoor, singer
 Shantanu Moitra, music composer
 Gayatri Iyer, singer
 Baba Sehgal, singer
 Aditi Sharma, actress
 Kushal Tandon, actor
 Richa Panai, actress
 Zoya Afroz, actress, Miss India
 Anaika Soti, actress
 Nandini Singh, actress
 Amrapali Gupta, actress
 Surendra Pal, actor
 Kumar Gaurav, actor
 Arti Singh, actress
 Gungun Uprari, actress
 Cliff Richard, singer
 Amit Sadh, actor
 Anil Rastogi, actor
 Malini Awasthi, singer
 Roshan Abbas, TV anchor
 Javed Akhtar, writer
 Vartika Singh, actress, Miss India

Activists
 Sehba Hussain, activist, former member of National Advisory Council
 Runa Banerjee, social worker and co-founder of the Self Employed Women's Association (SEWA)

Poets, authors and journalists
 Mir Babar Ali Anis, Marsiya writer (poet)
 Iftikhar Arif, poet
 Brij Narayan Chakbast, poet
 Mirza Dabeer, Marsiya writer (poet)
 Altaf Fatima, novelist
 Rosie Llewellyn-Jones, Lucknow historian
 Majaz, poet
 Josh Malihabadi, poet
 Vinod Mehta, journalist
 Mir Taqi Mir, poet
 Amaresh Misra, historian and author
 Maulana Hasrat Mohani, poet
 Syed Sulaiman Nadvi, Islamic historian
 Syed Abul Hasan Ali Hasani Nadwi, Islamic scholar and writer
 Amritlal Nagar, novelist
 Suryakumar Pandey, poet
 Manikonda Chalapathi Rau, journalist
 Mirza Hadi Ruswa, poet
 Ratan Nath Dhar Sarshar, novelist
 K.P. Saxena, poet
 Abdul Halim Sharar, Lucknow historian
 Gaura Pant Shivani, writer
 Sri Lal Sukla. novelist
 Shaukat Siddiqui, novelist
 Srijan Pal Singh, author and advisor to A. P. J. Abdul Kalam 
 Ruchita Misra, author 
 Bhagwati Charan Verma, writer
 Yashpal, novelist, freedom fighter 
 Mohsin Zaidi, poet
 Masroor Jahan, novelist and short-story writer
 Zameer Akhtar Naqvi poet
 yogesh praveen historian and author

Business and professionals 
 Agha Hasan Abedi, Pakistani banker and philanthropist
 Manoj Bhargava, US-based entrepreneur; founder and CEO of 5-Hour Energy Drink
 Mohita Chaurasia, technical product manager II, Amazon Web Services
 Ved Rattan Mohan, MD of Mohan Meakin
 Prashant Pathak, Canadian investor and entrepreneur
 Rajesh Gopinathan, MD and CEO of Tata Consultancy Services
 Subrata Roy, businessman; worker director of Sahara India Pariwar, the world's largest employer
 Syed Safawi, entrepreneur

Military
 John Alexander, soldier
 John Coleman, soldier
 Edward Hilton, soldier
 William Stephen Raikes Hodson, British officer
 Henry Montgomery Lawrence, soldier
 Claude Martin, French major general who fought for the British; established La Martiniere Schools at Lucknow, Lyons and Calcutta
 Sir James Outram, 1st Baronet, British general
 Manoj Kumar Pandey, 1st battalion, 11 Gorkha Rifles, Param Vir Chakra
 Arthur Skey, Royal Navy rear-admiral
 George Powell Thomas, A British soldier, artist and poet.

Politics
 Intezar Abidi, politician 
 K. C. Singh Baba, Parliament
 Mirza Hameedullah Beg, former Chief Justice of India
 Shuja-ud-Daula, Nawab of Oudh
 Sandeep Dikshit, Parliament
 Asaf-Ud-Dowlah, Nawab of Oudh
 Chandra Bhanu Gupta Three times Chief Minister of UP.
 Amir Haider, Senior Congress Leader 
 Mohammad Haleem, former Chief Justice of Pakistan
 Mohammad Hidayatullah, former acting President of India (1969–1969); former vice-president of India (1979–1984); 11th Chief justice of India (1968–1970)
 Sheila Kaul, former Union Cabinet Minister in India
 Rajkumari Amrit Kaur, former Minister of Health
 Begum Hazrat Mahal, Queen of Oudh
 Satish Mishra, lawyer
 Brajesh Pathak, politician
 Ashok Kumar Rawat, politician
 Mohammad Yunus Saleem, lawyer
 Sayed, Nawab of Oudh
 Wajid Ali Shah, Nawab of Oudh
 Shankar Dayal Sharma, former President of India
 Kirti Vardhan Singh, Parliament
 Kaushal Kishore, Indian Politician
 Sarvraj Singh, politician
 Anne Warner, Australian politician

Sports
 Afaq Hussain, cricketer
 Shahid Mahmood, cricketer
 Ravinder Pal Singh, hockey
 Apoorva Sengupta, cricketer
 Rinku Singh, professional wrestler signed with WWE's development territory NXT
 Suresh Raina, cricketer
 Arthur Skey, cricketer

References

 
People
Lucknow
Lucknow